Bernd Otto Neumann (born 6 January 1942) is a former German politician and since 2014 president of the German Federal Film Board (FFA).

Biography 

Neumann was born in Elbing,  East Prussia, now Elbląg, Poland.  Following the flight and expulsion of Germans after World War II he found refuge in  Bremen, West Germany. Neumann studied from 1961 to 1966 at the University of Bremen and later he worked as teacher until 1971 in Bremen. Neumann is married and has two children.

Since 1962, Neumann has been a member of the Christian Democratic Union (CDU). From 1979 to 2008, he led the CDU in Bremen. He was a member of the Bürgerschaft of Bremen from 1971 to 1987. Since 1987, Neumann has been a member of the Bundestag. He served from 1991 to 1998 as Secretary of State in the Federal Ministry of Research and Technology. From November 2005 until December 2013, Neumann was the Minister of State at the German Chancellery and Representative of the Federal Government for Culture. At the 2009 federal election, he unsuccessfully contested the Bremen II – Bremerhaven constituency, but was elected from the land list.

See also 
 Cabinet Kohl IV
 Cabinet Kohl V
 Merkel Cabinet

References

External links 

 Bernd Neumann in German National Library

1942 births
Living people
People from East Prussia
People from Elbląg
Members of the Bundestag for Bremen
University of Bremen alumni
Officers Crosses of the Order of Merit of the Federal Republic of Germany
Members of the Bundestag 2009–2013
Members of the Bundestag 2005–2009
Members of the Bundestag 2002–2005
Members of the Bundestag 1998–2002
Members of the Bundestag 1994–1998
Members of the Bundestag 1990–1994
Members of the Bundestag for the Christian Democratic Union of Germany